9 December Avenue, commonly known as Paseo Colón, is an avenue in the historic centre of Lima, Peru. The street is named after the statue of Christopher Columbus located in the avenue.

History
The place where the Paseo Colón extends today constituted, during the viceregal era, the southern limit of the city where the Walls of Lima stood. In 1898, during the government of President Nicolás de Piérola, the avenue was drawn up with the name of 9 de Diciembre and would later be renamed Paseo Colón due to its pedestrian nature. From the moment it was laid out, Paseo Colón was considered an aristocratic avenue since it was located in the middle of the Parque de la Exposición. As proof of this, the buildings on the road still show their republican-style decorations. However, this road suffered a great deterioration during the eighties, currently it has undergone an efficient recovery.

See also
Historic Centre of Lima

References

Colón